Todd Andrew Simon (born August 3, 1980) is an American college basketball coach who is the current head coach at Bowling Green State University.

Early life and education
Born in Fowler, Michigan, Simon graduated from Central Michigan University in 2003 as a double major in sport studies and management information systems. He was on full academic scholarship as a recipient of Central Michigan's Centralis Scholarship. In 2010, Simon completed a master's degree in sport education leadership at the University of Nevada, Las Vegas (UNLV).

Career
In the 2002–03 school year, Simon was junior varsity boys' basketball head coach and a varsity assistant coach at Harrison Community High School in Harrison, Michigan. Simon then was a volunteer assistant at Pepperdine University in the 2003–04 season under Paul Westphal before becoming an video assistant under Lon Kruger at UNLV from 2004 to 2006.

From 2006 to 2012, Simon was part of the founding staff as an assistant coach at basketball power Findlay Prep in Henderson, Nevada before assuming the head coach spot for the 2012–13 season. From 2007 until his departure in 2013, Findlay was 192-9 with 3 National High School Invitational Championships. As Head Coach in '12-'13, Simon set a program record with 35 victories and finished 35-1 and shared a mythical National Title as co-#1 in the final Bluestar Media Poll.

During his time at Findlay, Simon helped develop and coach a number of top NBA draft picks, including Anthony Bennett, who was selected as the top overall pick in 2013, first round picks Tristan Thompson, Avery Bradley, Cory Joseph. Other NBA player's Simon coached at Findlay include Christian Wood, Jorge Gutierrez, Jabari Brown, Deandre Liggins, Nick Johnson, Naz Long, and Nigel Williams-Goss. In addition, MLB pitcher Amir Garrett played at Findlay during his tenure.

In 2013, Simon returned to UNLV as an associate head coach, this time under Dave Rice. As recruiting coordinator, UNLV had the #4 recruiting class nationally in 2014 and #11 class in 2015 including signing 2 McDonald's All-Americans and a Jordan Brand All-American. During Simon's 3 years at UNLV, 6 Runnin' Rebels made the NBA; Khem Birch, Patrick McCaw, Rashad Vaughn, Stephen Zimmerman, Derrick Jones Jr. and Bryce Dejean-Jones.

When head coach Dave Rice was dismissed after an 0-3 conference start on January 10, 2016, Simon was named interim head coach of the Runnin' Rebels. The Runnin' Rebels had lost 6 of 8 games when Simon was named interim head coach and led the team to a 9–8 record in 17 games as head coach despite playing with as few as 5 scholarship players due to injuries.

Following the season, Simon was hired as head coach for Southern Utah.

At the beginning of the 2022-23 season, Todd Simon will be in his seventh year at the helm of the Southern Utah University men's basketball team after being named the head coach on March 24, 2016. After finishing 6 seasons in the Big Sky, Simon finished 24th in all-time wins as a Big Sky Head Coach. The Thunderbirds now compete in the Western Athletic Conference.

Simon led Southern Utah to 23 wins in the 2021-22 season, achieving the second most victories in a single season in SUU’s Division I history. The Thunderbirds compiled a record of 20-10 throughout the regular season, including a mark of 14-6 in conference play to earn the number two overall seed in the Big Sky Conference Tournament and a first round bye for the second consecutive year.

Following the Big Sky Tournament, Simon’s Thunderbirds accepted an invitation to participate in the inaugural Basketball Classic, where they were matched up with MAC opponent Kent State in the first round. Southern Utah claimed victory over Kent State, advancing to the second round where they defeated Conference-USA opponent UTEP on the road. SUU then faced West Coast Conference foe Portland in the quarterfinals, picking up their third consecutive postseason victory to reach the semifinal round.

Simon and Southern Utah once again did an incredible job of protecting homecourt in the 2021-22 season, amassing a record of 13-3 at the America First Event Center. Southern Utah also finished the season ranked second overall in the Big Sky Conference in scoring (77.7 ppg) and first in rebounding (32.9 rpg).

The 2021-22 season also saw three different Thunderbirds earn All-Big Sky recognition, as John Knight III became the second player in program history to earn First Team All-Big Sky honors. Tevian Jones and Maizen Fausett were each named to the All-Conference Third Team.

During the 2020-21 season Simon led the Thunderbirds to a top 10 win percentage nationally going 20-4 (.864) and led them to their first ever Big Sky Championship, as they were named Big Sky Conference Regular Season Champions after finishing conference play with a record of 12-2. Along with claiming the Regular Season Championship, Simon navigated his team to the No. 1 overall seed in the Big Sky Conference Tournament, and the first BYE to the quarterfinals that the program had ever received.

Simon's Thunderbirds set a high bar that season finishing the regular season with a .864 winning percentage, which was the best in the program's Division I history. They also finished their Big Sky Conference schedule with a .857 winning percentage, shattering the previous high of .450. Along with the overall accolades, the Thunderbirds finished the season 14-0 at home. It was only the second time in the program's Division I history that they finished the regular season flawless at home, and marked the most victories at home in a single season in the program's DI tenure.

The 2020-21 edition of the Thunderbirds also finished the regular season with the best scoring offense in the Big Sky, averaging 84.2 points per game. That number was good enough for the third highest mark in the NCAA as well.

The 2020-21 season also saw four Thunderbirds be named to the Big Sky All-Conference team, the most since they joined the conference. Tevian Jones became the first Thunderbird to be named to the All-Conference First Team after finishing the season as the fourth-highest scorer in the Big Sky. Jones was also named to the NABC All-District First Team for District 6. John Knight III and Maizen Fausett were both named to the Big Sky All-Conference Second Team and Dre Marin was named an Honorable Mention.

At the conclusion of the season, Simon was named Big Sky Coach of the Year, NABC District 6 Coach of the Year, the winner of the 2021 Jim Phelan National Coach of the Year Award, and a finalist for the Skip Prosser Man of the Year Award and the Hugh Durham Award.

Since the beginning of the 2020-21 season, Simon has led Southern Utah to an overall record 43-16, a mark of 26-8 in the Big Sky Conference, and record of 27-3 on their home court. SUU’s winning perecntage of 72.9 percent over the past two seasons ranks seventh in the entire western region of the country.

Southern Utah ended the 2019-20 season with a 17-15 overall record, marking the first time the program had finished above .500 since the 2006-07 season. SUU’s winning percentage of .531 was the third-highest the program had experienced since the year 2000. The Thunderbirds finished the season ranked 161st in the KenPom Rankings, which was a jump up of 112 spots from the previous year and was the highest ranking the program had reached in the KenPom Era (2001). The T-Birds were on track to make their second-consecutive postseason appearance, but all postseason play was canceled in the NCAA. 

Defensive efficiency was the key for the Thunderbirds, as they ranked first in the Big Sky in Defensive FG%, Defensive Rebounding %, Rebounding Margin and Blocked Shots. They were also ranked second in Three-Point Field Goal % Defense.

In just the second game of the 2019-2020 campaign, the T-Birds pulled a stunning upset of Nebraska in double overtime, 79-78. It was the program’s first victory over a Big Ten opponent, and their first road victory against a Power Five opponent since 1996. SUU became just the second-ever Big Sky team to win on the road against an opponent from the conference. They also ended a 20-year drought of losses against the Montana Grizzlies, in a thrilling 85-80 victory in Missoula. 

Following the 2019-20 regular season, Cameron Oluyitan was honored by the Big Sky for the second-consecutive season as a member of the Big Sky All-Conference Team.

The fans in Cedar City also started taking notice more than ever before though the 2019-20 campaign, as the program set new records for all-time revenue, all-time highest average game revenue and set records for amount of students in the student section on three separate occasions.

Simon’s third season with the program was one for the record books, and one of the most successful the program has experienced in recent memory. The Thunderbirds qualified for postseason play for the first time since 2001, and won the first postseason game in the program’s Division I history in the First Round of the CollegeInsider.com Postseason Tournament. The T-Birds defeated the Drake Bulldogs, who were Co-Regular Season Champions of the Missouri Valley Conference.

The 2018-19 season provided several milestones. SUU finished .500 for the first time since the 2006-07 season with a mark of 17-17. The T-Birds won nine Big Sky Conference games, which was the most the program had earned since joining the league. They also secured back-to-back winning non-conference records. Along with those accolades, Cameron Oluyitan won Big Sky Newcomer of the Year, and the T-Birds swept rival Weber State.

SUU also found plenty of success in the Big Sky Tournament in Simon’s third season, knocking off Idaho State and Northern Colorado to make the Big Sky Semifinals for the second-consecutive season.   

In his second year with the team the Thunderbirds won 13 contests in 2017-18, and made it to the semifinals of the Big Sky Conference Championship Tournament for the first time in the history of the program. The 13 wins the program reached more than doubled the win total of the team Simon inherited.

In 2017-18 the Thunderbirds finished 9-5 at home. They beat a team from the Mountain West Conference for the first time since 2006 and a team from the West Coast Conference since the turn of the century. The Thunderbirds finished non-conference play 6-5, marking the first time the team had finished above .500 outside of league play since the 2006-07 season.  

In his first year with the program Simon led the Thunderbirds to a first-round win at the Big Sky Road to Reno Conference Tournament with a triple overtime victory over Montana State.

The Southern Utah program averaged 4.5 Division 1 wins from 2013-2017 and had an APR postseason ban in 2010. Southern Utah was named the 2nd toughest job in the league in 2019 by fellow coaches by Stadium.com. The turnaround at Southern Utah has seen 3 Straight Big Sky Tournament Semifinals, an improved SUU winning percentage each season from '16 to '21, the best win percentage in school history in '20-'21 (20-4), highest final ranking (#15) in the Collegeinsider Mid-Major Top 25, twice posted perfect 1000 APR scores and have graduated every senior since 2016. Additionally, the Thunderbirds are 50-15 (.769) at home over the past 5 seasons. Simon is 2nd All-time in wins at SUU.

On March 15, 2023, it was announced that Simon had been hired as the next head coach at Bowling Green, replacing Michael Huger.

Head coaching record

References

External links
 UNLV bio

1980 births
Living people
American men's basketball coaches
Basketball coaches from Michigan
Bowling Green Falcons men's basketball coaches
Central Michigan University alumni
College men's basketball head coaches in the United States
High school basketball coaches in the United States
People from Clinton County, Michigan
Pepperdine Waves men's basketball coaches
Southern Utah Thunderbirds men's basketball coaches
University of Nevada, Las Vegas alumni
UNLV Runnin' Rebels basketball coaches